Bill Hunter or Billy Hunter may refer to:

Sports figures

American
 Bill Hunter (catcher) (1855–1918), baseball catcher
 Bill Hunter (outfielder) (1887–1934), American baseball player
 Billy Hunter (basketball) (born 1942), former National Basketball Players Association executive
 Billy Hunter (baseball) (born 1928), MLB All-Star shortstop and manager

Scottish
 Bill Hunter (footballer, born 1900), Scottish football defender
 Billy Hunter (footballer) (1885–1937), Scottish professional football player and manager

Other
 Bill Hunter (ice hockey) (1920–2002), Canadian hockey owner, general manager, coach
 Bill Hunter (New Zealand footballer), New Zealand international football (soccer) player

Other people
 Bill Hunter (politician) (1920–2015), Trotskyist leader in Britain and an International Socialist League member
 Bill Hunter (actor) (1940–2011), Australian actor
 Bill Hunter (journalist) (1928–1964), American crime reporter

See also
 William Hunter (disambiguation)